The Black Widow (1947) is a thirteen-chapter Republic serial film.

Plot
The Editor of the Daily Clarion newspaper hires amateur criminologist Steve Colt to solve a series of murders, all involving venomous spider bites.

Meanwhile, King Hitomu has sent his daughter Sombra to the United States to fulfill his plan for global domination.  There she poses as a fortune teller and, with a gang of henchmen, attempts to steal a prototype Atomic Rocket Engine using her uncanny ability to impersonate other women.

Cast
 Bruce Edwards as Steve Colt, an amateur criminologist on the trail of a series of bizarre murders.
 Virginia Lindley as Joyce Winters, Colt's friend who Sombra impersonates in order to get close to him.
 Carol Forman as Sombra, daughter and agent of King Hitomu. She is an expert at disguises, manipulation, and planning.
 Anthony Warde as Nick Ward, a gangster working with Sombra
 Ramsay Ames as Ruth Dayton, a secretary who is kidnapped and replaced with Sombra in a mask and wig.
 I. Stanford Jolley as Dr. Z.V Jaffa, a scientist working with Sombra
 Theodore Gottlieb as King Hitomu, a villain intent on world domination
 Forrest Taylor as Bradley, a gang lawyer
 Virginia Carroll as Dr. Ann Curry

Production
The Black Widow was budgeted at $168,995 although the final negative cost was $186,314 (a $17,319, or 10.2%, overspend).  It was the most expensive Republic serial of 1947.

It was filmed between 11 April and 8 May 1947.  The serial's production number was 1697.

It was one of only four 13-chapter serials to be released by Republic.  Three of the four were released in 1947, the only original serials released in that year.  The fourth serial of the year was a re-release of the 15-chapter, 1941 serial Jungle Girl.  This marked the first time Republic had re-released a serial to add to their first run serial releases.

Stunts
 Tom Steele as Steve Colt (doubling Bruce Edwards)
 Dale Van Sickel as Nick Ward (doubling Anthony Warde)
 Bud Wolfe as Nick Ward (doubling Anthony Warde)

Special Effects
Created by the Lydecker brothers.

Release

Theatrical
The Black Widow's official release date is 1 November 1947, although this is actually the date the sixth chapter was made available to film exchanges.

Television
In the early 1950s, The Black Widow was one of fourteen Republic serials edited into a television series.  It was broadcast in six 26½-minute episodes.

The Black Widow was one of twenty-six Republic serials re-released as a film on television in 1966.  The title of the film was changed to Sombra, the Spider Woman.  This version was cut down to 100-minutes in length.

Chapter titles
 Deadly Prophecy (20 min)
 The Stolen Formula (13min 20s)
 Hidden Death (13min 20s)
 Peril in the Sky (13min 20s)
 The Spider's Lair (13min 20s)
 Glass Guillotine (13min 20s)
 Wheels of Death (13min 20s)
 False Information (13min 20s)
 The Spider's Venom (13min 20s) - a re-cap chapter
 The Stolen Corpse (13min 20s)
 Death Dials a Number (13min 20s)
 The Talking Mirror (13min 20s)
 A Life for a Life (13min 20s)
Source:

See also
 List of film serials by year
 List of film serials by studio

References

External links
 

1947 films
1940s spy films
American spy films
American black-and-white films
1940s English-language films
Republic Pictures film serials
Films directed by Spencer Gordon Bennet
Films directed by Fred C. Brannon
1940s American films